The United Hockey League (UHL), originally known as the Colonial Hockey League from 1991 to 1997 and last known as the International Hockey League from 2007 to 2010, was a low-level minor professional ice hockey league, with teams in the United States and Canada. The league was headquartered in Rochester, Michigan, and, in its last year, consisted of seven teams. It folded in 2010, with most of its teams joining the Central Hockey League. The Central Hockey League teams still operating in 2014 were then added to ECHL. The only former CoHL/UHL/IHL teams still active as of 2022 are the Fort Wayne Komets and Kalamazoo Wings.

History

The UHL was originally formed in 1991 as the Colonial Hockey League and had teams in Brantford, Ontario; Detroit, Michigan; Flint, Michigan; St. Thomas, Ontario; and Thunder Bay, Ontario; the avowed goal of the league organizers was to fill the low-level niche in the Great Lakes area abandoned by the original International Hockey League as the latter league engaged in upmarket expansion. As time passed, the CoHL moved eastward, into places like Glens Falls, NY; Danbury, CT; Utica, NY; Binghamton, NY; and Richmond, VA. During that expansion, the league was renamed "United Hockey League" (UHL) and the headquarters was moved to Lake St. Louis, Missouri in 1997.

The 2006–07 season was the last season of play for the league under the UHL name. Following the 2006–07 season, the league lost half of its ten teams. The franchises in Moline and Rockford, Illinois moved to the American Hockey League, the team in Elmira, New York, went to the ECHL, and the franchises in Chicago, Illinois and Port Huron, Michigan ceased operations. In June 2007, at the league’s annual meeting, the UHL announced that it was changing its name to the "International Hockey League" (IHL). Paul L. Pickard was named the first president and CEO of the new IHL. During that summer, the UHL headquarters moved from Lake St. Louis, Missouri to Rochester, Michigan. The UHL's rebranding was intended to evoke the original IHL, which had ceased operations in 2001 and covered much of the new IHL's footprint. The Fort Wayne Komets were a longtime member of the original league while the Kalamazoo Wings and Flint Generals franchises were revived names of the original Kalamazoo and Flint IHL teams.

On July 13, 2010, the league announced an agreement with the Central Hockey League, the effects of which saw five IHL teams – the Bloomington PrairieThunder, Dayton Gems, Evansville IceMen, Fort Wayne Komets and Quad City Mallards – absorbed into the CHL. The remaining two franchises from the league's last season that were not absorbed into the CHL, the Flint Generals and the Port Huron Icehawks, folded.

Governance

Dennis Hextall was named as the president and commissioner of the International Hockey League on September 2, 2009. Hextall was preceded by Paul Pickard, who served as commissioner for the first two years of the renamed league (2007–2009).

Several UHL teams had affiliations with the National Hockey League, American Hockey League, and the All American Hockey League.

Teams

Expansion

Timeline

History of teams

 Adirondack Frostbite 2004–2006
 Adirondack IceHawks 1999–2004, later Adirondack Frostbite
 Asheville Smoke 1998–2002
 Arctic Xpress 2000–2001 (did not play), later Canton Xpress
 B.C. Icemen 1997–2002
 Bloomington PrairieThunder (2006–10), merged into Central Hockey League
 Brantford Smoke 1991–1998, later Asheville Smoke
 Canton Ice Patrol 2002 (did not play)
 Canton Xpress 2001 – January 28, 2002 (did not play), later Canton Ice Patrol
 Chatham Wheels 1992–1994, later Saginaw Wheels
 Chicago Hounds 2006–2007
 Columbus Stars 2003 – January 9, 2004
 Danbury Trashers 2004–2006
 Dayton Gems 2009–2010, merged into Central Hockey League
 Dayton Ice Bandits 1996–1997, later Mohawk Valley Prowlers
 Detroit Falcons 1992–1996
 Elmira Jackals 2000–2007, moved to ECHL
 Evansville IceMen 2010, merged into Central Hockey League
 Flint Bulldogs 1991–1993, later Utica Bulldogs
 Flint Generals 1993–2010
 Fort Wayne Komets 1999–2010, merged into Central Hockey League
 Kalamazoo Wings 2000–2009, Wings moved to ECHL
 Kansas City Outlaws 2004–2005
 Knoxville Speed 1999–2002
 Lehigh Valley Xtreme 2000 (did not play)
 London Wildcats 1994–1995, later Dayton Ice Bandits
 Madison Kodiaks 1999–2000, later Kalamazoo Wings
 Madison Monsters 1995–1999, later Knoxville Speed
 Michigan Falcons 1991–1992, later Detroit Falcons
 Missouri River Otters 1999–2006
 Mohawk Valley Prowlers 1998–February 2001
 Motor City Mechanics 2004–2006
 Muskegon Fury 1992–2008, rebranded as Lumberjacks
 Muskegon Lumberjacks 2008–2010, later Evansville IceMen
 New Haven Knights 2000–2002
 Ohio Gears December 20, 1999 – 2000, later Arctic Xpress
 Port Huron Beacons 2002–2005, later Roanoke Valley Vipers
 Port Huron Border Cats 1996–2002
 Port Huron Icehawks 2007–2010
 Port Huron Flags 2005–2007
 Quad City Mallards 1995–2007
 Quad City Mallards 2009–2010, merged into Central Hockey League
 Richmond RiverDogs 2003–2006, later Chicago Hounds
 Roanoke Valley Vipers 2005–2006
 Rockford IceHogs 1999–2007, assets bought out by Rockford IceHogs of American Hockey League
 Saginaw Gears 1998 – December 19, 1999, later Ohio Gears
 Saginaw LumberKings 1996–1998, later Saginaw Gears
 Saginaw Wheels 1994–1996, later Saginaw LumberKings
 St. Thomas Wildcats 1991–1994, later London Wildcats
 Thunder Bay Senators 1993–1996, later Thunder Bay Thunder Cats
 Thunder Bay Thunder Cats 1996–1999, later Rockford IceHogs
 Thunder Bay Thunder Hawks 1991–1993, later Thunder Bay Senators
 Utica Bulldogs 1993–1994
 Utica Blizzard 1994–1997, later Winston-Salem IceHawks
 Winston-Salem IceHawks 1997–1999, later Adirondack IceHawks

Colonial/Turner Cup champions

The Colonial Cup was the league's championship trophy. The name was changed to the Turner Cup in 2007 to reflect the original IHL's championship trophy, also named the Turner Cup.

 1992 – Thunder Bay Thunder Hawks
 1993 – Brantford Smoke
 1994 – Thunder Bay Senators
 1995 – Thunder Bay Senators
 1996 – Flint Generals
 1997 – Quad City Mallards
 1998 – Quad City Mallards
 1999 – Muskegon Fury
 2000 – Flint Generals
 2001 – Quad City Mallards
 2002 – Muskegon Fury
 2003 – Fort Wayne Komets
 2004 – Muskegon Fury
 2005 – Muskegon Fury
 2006 – Kalamazoo Wings
 2007 – Rockford IceHogs
 2008 – Fort Wayne Komets
 2009 – Fort Wayne Komets
 2010 – Fort Wayne Komets

Awards
UHL Best Goaltender

See also
 List of developmental and minor sports leagues
 List of ice hockey leagues
 Minor league
 Sports league attendances

References

External links
 Official IHL website
 UHL Yearly Standings

 
Defunct ice hockey leagues in the United States
Defunct ice hockey leagues in Canada
Minor league ice hockey